David "Smokey" Gaines (February 27, 1940 – September 5, 2020) was an American basketball player and coach.

Playing career
He played professionally for three games for the Kentucky Colonels during the 1967–68 American Basketball Association season after a four-year stint with the Harlem Globetrotters. Gaines attended LeMoyne-Owen College from 1959 to 1963 where he was the first player to have his number retired.

Coaching career
After his playing days Gaines became a men's college basketball coach, serving as head coach for the Detroit Mercy and San Diego State Aztecs. He replaced Dick Vitale at the former school, and coached Michael Cage and future Baseball Hall-of-Famer Tony Gwynn at the latter. He compiled a 112–117 record in eight seasons at San Diego State University (SDSU) and became the first black head coach in NCAA Division I in California. He was named the coach of the year of the Western Athletic Conference in 1984–85, when the Aztecs went 24–8 and qualified for the NCAA tournament. Gaines was named athletic director for the Memphis City Schools in 2008, after coaching and serving as the athletic director at LeMoyne-Owen.

Coaching Record

Death
Gaines died on September 5, 2020, from cancer.

Notes

References

External links

Harlem Globetrotters Profile

1940 births
2020 deaths
American men's basketball players
Basketball players from Detroit
Detroit Mercy Titans men's basketball coaches
Harlem Globetrotters players
International Basketball League (1999–2001) coaches
Kentucky Colonels players
LeMoyne–Owen Magicians basketball players
Northeastern High School (Michigan) alumni
San Diego State Aztecs men's basketball coaches